The Wuling Hongguang S3 is a compact SUV produced by SAIC-GM-Wuling, the joint venture of Shanghai Automotive Industry Corporation, Liuzhou Wuling Motors Co and GM China under the Wuling Hongguang product series.

Overview
The Wuling Hongguang S3 was unveiled during the 2017 Shanghai Auto Show in China. It is powered by a  1.5-litre naturally aspirated engine or a  1.5-litre turbocharged engine, with each engine mated to a five-speed manual gearbox. As the first SUV of the Wuling brand, it seats seven in a 2-2-3 configuration. 

The S3 was aimed at the low end of the market with prices ranging from 56,800 to 81,800 yuan ($9,012 – 12,778).

See also
Wuling Hongguang S1, the compact MPV that shares the same platform positioned slightly below the Wuling Hongguang S3

References

External links

 Wuling Hongguang S3 website (China)

Hongguang S3
Cars introduced in 2017
2020s cars
Compact sport utility vehicles
Rear-wheel-drive vehicles
Cars of China